William J. Wallace was the seventh mayor of the city of Indianapolis, Indiana, and the first Republican to hold that office. Wallace won a special election in 1856 following the death of mayor Henry F. West and the short interim of Charles G. Coulon. Wallace resigned his post in May 1858. His son Henry R. Wallace was also mayor (1913–1914).

References

Mayors of Indianapolis
Indiana Republicans
Year of birth missing
Year of death missing
19th-century American politicians